Donald E. Hanson (April 26, 1926 – June 27, 2012) was an American politician and educator.

Hanson was born in Lyon County, Minnesota, on April 26, 1926. Upon his discharge from the United States Navy, he pursued a bachelor's degree in education at Northwest Missouri State University, completed a master of arts at the University of Wyoming, and obtained a doctorate of education at Western Michigan University. Hanson then became a schoolteacher and administrator. After retiring from teaching, Hanson served three consecutive terms on the Iowa House of Representatives. He was elected as a Republican legislator from District 26 between 1991 and 1993, and held the District 24 seat from 1993 to 1997. Hanson married his wife Jo in 1950, and raised three children.

Hanson died in Cedar Falls, Iowa on June 27, 2012, at the age of 86.

References

1926 births
2012 deaths
Republican Party members of the Iowa House of Representatives
People from Lyon County, Minnesota
People from Black Hawk County, Iowa
20th-century American educators
Schoolteachers from Iowa
Schoolteachers from Minnesota
American school administrators
20th-century American politicians
United States Navy sailors
Military personnel from Iowa
University of Wyoming alumni
Northwest Missouri State University alumni
Western Michigan University alumni